Lennox and Addington was a federal electoral district represented in the House of Commons of Canada from 1904 to 1925. It was located in the province of Ontario. This riding was first created in 1903 from Addington and Lennox ridings. It consisted of the county of Lennox and Addington.

The electoral district was abolished in 1924 when it was redistributed between Frontenac—Addington and Prince Edward—Lennox ridings.

Electoral history

|}

|}

|}

|}

|}

See also 

 List of Canadian federal electoral districts
 Past Canadian electoral districts

External links 
 Parliamentary website

Former federal electoral districts of Ontario